SAM at 8Q is the annexe of Singapore Art Museum - Singapore's contemporary art museum. Located at the heart of the city, it derives its name from the museum's location at No. 8 Queen Street near Bras Basah Road. SAM at 8Q is also approximately 88 steps away from Singapore Art Museum.

History
The 4-storey building was formerly the primary school wing of the Catholic High School. When the School relocated to their current location in 1987, the  space gave home to the Kim Yan Cantonese Methodist Church. In September 2007, the Church ended its tenancy and the building was repossessed by the Singapore Land Authority.

Launch
With new interest on contemporary art by the young, the National Heritage Board (NHB) took up tenancy of the building from the Land Authority. The Board also spent $5.8 million on renovations, and converted the classrooms in the 4-storey building into six galleries to showcase contemporary installation works, video and photography installation, performance art and sound art. A lift was also installed, and the galleries, staircases and parts of corridors have also been air-conditioned and humidity-controlled. There are also spaces to house two restaurants on the ground floor which are currently occupied by Love Pal Cafe and Standing Sushi Bar.

SAM at 8Q was officially opened on 15 August 2008 with an inaugural 8-man art exhibition titled 8Q-Rate: School; a name pun from the word 'curate'. 8Q-Rate featured the works by young contemporary artists such as :Jahan Loh, Donna Ong, Grace Tan, Chong Li Chuan, Jason Wee, Tan Kai Syng, Phunk and sculptor Ahmad Abu Bakar.

SAM at 8Q is currently home to changing contemporary art exhibitions, including a popular annual children's contemporary art exhibition.

Location and facilities 

Situated in the centre of Singapore’s major shopping district and Waterloo Street Arts Belt, SAM and SAM at 8Q are located alongside Singapore’s major performing arts and visual arts institutions: such as the Nanyang Academy of Fine Art, LaSalle College of the Arts, the Stamford Arts Centre, the Selegie Arts Centre, Singapore Calligraphy Centre, YMS Arts Centre, Dance Ensemble Singapore, Sculpture Square and Action Theatre as well as the School of the Arts: an institution that offers an integrated arts and academic curriculum for youths aged 13 to 18 years of age.

SAM at 8Q is accessible by major public transportation systems such as the public buses, the Mass Rapid Transit (MRT) lines and cab services. The nearest MRT station would be Brash Basah MRT station, on the Circle Line.

See also
 Singapore Art Museum

Gallery

References

External links
Singapore Art Museum Facebook
Singapore Art Museum Twitter
Singapore Art Museum YouTube channel

2008 establishments in Singapore
Art museums and galleries in Singapore
Art museums established in 2008
Contemporary art galleries in Asia
National museums of Singapore